Anni Biechl (born 17 March 1940) is a West German athlete who competed mainly in the 100 metres.

She competed for the United Team of Germany in the 1960 Summer Olympics held in Rome, Italy in the 4 x 100 metres where she won the silver medal with her teammates Martha Langbein, Brunhilde Hendrix and Jutta Heine.

References

External links
 

1940 births
Living people
German female sprinters
Athletes (track and field) at the 1960 Summer Olympics
Olympic athletes of the United Team of Germany
Olympic silver medalists for the United Team of Germany
Medalists at the 1960 Summer Olympics
Olympic silver medalists in athletics (track and field)
Olympic female sprinters